Margareta Birgitta Larsson, née Sandstedt (born 18 July 1964) is a Swedish politician and MP who since 2010 has place 271 in the Riksdagen. Larsson joined the Sweden Democrats in 2004 and was elected as an MP for the party at the 2010 general elections and again in the 2014 general elections. On 30 September 2015, Larsson announced that she had left the party but insisted she would continue her work in the riksdag as an independent.

Larsson was between 2006 and 2010 the chairman of Gävle city council. Her daughter Louise Erixon was the partner of the Sweden Democrat party leader Jimmie Åkesson.

References 

Living people
Independent politicians in Sweden
1964 births